Hajji Mohammad Ali Khan was the first khan (governor) of the Shirvan Khanate, ruling from 1761 to 1763. With the permission of the Zand ruler Karim Khan Zand, he was put in power by the inhabitants of Old Shamakhi. He governed Shirvan until 1763, when Fath-Ali Khan of Quba gained influence there, and appointed his own governors, such as Aghasi Beg and Askar Beg, both members of the same family.

References

Sources 
 

Khans
Shirvan Khanate
Year of death unknown
Year of birth unknown